George Michael Cuomo (1929 in New York City – October 26, 2015) was an American author of eight novels, as well as short stories, poetry, and a nonfiction book.

Life
He attended Stuyvesant High School and earned a B.A. from Tufts University in 1952 in addition to an M.A. from Indiana University in 1955. Furthermore, Cuomo has taught at the University of Arizona, the University of California, University of Victoria in British Columbia, and the University of Massachusetts Amherst.

His work appeared in Antioch Review, Minnesota Review, The Nation, Saturday Review, Tamarack Review.

Cuomo's first novel, Jack be Nimble, was published in 1963. The novel's eponymous narrator evokes (no doubt intentionally) the anti-hero of All the King's Men, transplanted to the topsy-turvy world of collegiate football.  His subsequent novels, which include Among Thieves, Family Honor, and Trial By Water, engage troubling issues of race, class, and social justice.  Cuomo's deeply fallible heroes tend to be people that genteel society would prefer to forget: a small-time criminal caught up in a brutal prison riot, a racial minority ensnared in a domestic terrorist plot.

His name has been mentioned more than once in lists of unfairly neglected authors, for example by Richard Yates in Ploughshares.
His papers are held at University of Victoria.

Awards
 1983 Guggenheim Fellowship

Works
 Trial By Water, Alfred A. Knopf Incorporated, 
 Jack be nimble: a novel, Doubleday, 1963
 Bright day, dark runner: a novel, Doubleday, 1964
 Among Thieves, Doubleday, 1968 
 Sing, choirs of angels, Doubleday, 1969
 The hero's great great great great great grandson: a novel, Atheneum, 1971
 Geronimo and the Girl Next Door, BkMk Press, 1973, 
 Family honor: an American life, Doubleday, 1983,

Anthologies

References

External links
 

 "The Fiction of George Cuomo", The Arizona quarterly, Volume 30, 1974

1929 births
2015 deaths
20th-century American novelists
Stuyvesant High School alumni
Tufts University alumni
Indiana University Bloomington alumni
University of California, Berkeley faculty
University of Arizona faculty
University of Massachusetts Amherst faculty
American male novelists
20th-century American male writers
Novelists from New York (state)
Novelists from Massachusetts
Novelists from Arizona